The 2002 WAC men's basketball tournament was held in the Reynolds Center in Tulsa, Oklahoma.  The winners of the tournament were the #1 seeded Hawaii Warriors.

Bracket 

* - denotes overtime period

References

WAC men's basketball tournament
Tournament
WAC Men's Basketball